The Telsiz ve Radyo Amatörleri Cemiyeti (TRAC) (in English, Wireless and Radio Amateur Society) is a national non-profit organization for amateur radio enthusiasts in Turkey.  The organization was founded in 1962 as the Türkiye Radyo Amatörleri Cemiyeti, adopting its current name in 1980.  With its headquarters located in Istanbul, TRAC has branches in 46 locations across Turkey.  TRAC is the national member society representing Turkey in the International Amateur Radio Union.

History 
Due to the difficulties related to the existing government regulations at that time, the organization initially focused on electronics training.  TRAC published a monthly electronics magazine, which became a reference journal in Turkey for those who wanted to learn about electronics. The magazine was recommended by the Ministry of Education as a learning aid.

TRAC began lobbying the government for amateur radio regulations two years after its formation.  Two attempts to establish an amateur radio service in Turkey were made in 1964 and again in 1966.  Joint proposals by the Ministry of Defence, TRAC, and the Electric Engineers' Association, these efforts to change the existing law found their way to a parliamentary commission but were never put into the legislative agenda.  Amateur radio regulations were finally established in 1983 with the passage of the Wireless Act. Historically, Turkey has suffered major natural disasters in which many have perished. Amateur radio's crucial importance and efficiency in establishing emergency communications during disasters and emergencies was cited as a main reason for establishing an active amateur radio service in Turkey.

Activity 
Key membership benefits of TRAC include the sponsorship of amateur radio operating awards and radio contests, and a QSL bureau for those members who regularly communicate with amateur radio operators in other countries.  TRAC represents the interests of Turkish amateur radio operators before Turkish and international telecommunications regulatory authorities.

See also 
International Amateur Radio Union

References 

Turkey
Organizations established in 1962
Radio in Turkey
Organizations based in Istanbul
1962 establishments in Turkey
Beyoğlu